Hawlings River is a  tributary of the Patuxent River in Montgomery County, Maryland. The waterway was originally called Holland's River. Portions of Hawlings River flow through 
Rachel Carson Conservation Park and Hawlings River Stream Valley Park. Tributaries of the Hawlings River include Mount Zion Tributary, Reddy Branch, Olney Mill Tributary, Gregg Tributary, and James Creek.

Before 1769 local residents petitioned the colonial government to build a chapel on the river.

See also
List of rivers of Maryland

References
Notes

Bibliography

 MCDEP. "Watershed Information: The Hawlings River Watershed."

Tributaries of the Patuxent River
Rivers of Montgomery County, Maryland
Rivers of Maryland